Phuparash Peak is a mountain in Hispar Valley in the Gilgit District, Gilgit–Baltistan, Pakistan. It lies east of Miar Peak (6,824 m).

See also
 List of mountains in Pakistan

External links
 Northern Pakistan detailed placemarks in Google Earth

Mountains of Gilgit-Baltistan
Six-thousanders of the Karakoram